The Ultra-Trail du Mont-Blanc (UTMB) is a mountain ultramarathon race, first held in 2003, that follows the route of the Tour du Mont Blanc. It has been regarded as the most competitive trail ultramarathon in the world.

Renamed in 2023 as UTMB World Series Finals, it is the final event of the UTMB World Series qualification races held throughout the world.

Description
The race takes place once a year on either the last weekend in August or the first weekend of September in the Alps. It follows the route of the Tour du Mont Blanc through France, Italy and Switzerland. It is widely regarded as one of the most difficult foot races in the world, and one of the largest with more than 2,500 starters. It is one of several races during a week-long festival based around Chamonix in France, and is a race of the Ultra-Trail World Tour. The races have strict entry and qualification requirements attained by accumulating enough race points through qualifying trail races over the previous two-year period. In 2016 and 2017, 42% and 35% of runners did not finish the UTMB race. 

While the best runners complete the loop in slightly more than 20 hours, most runners take 32 to 46 hours to reach the finish line. Most runners will have to run through two nights to complete the race. 

Since 2006, a second race Courmayeur - Champex - Chamonix (half-loop) has also been organised, and a third race was added in 2009: "Sur les Traces des Ducs de Savoie".  A fourth shorter "running" event - Orsières - Champex - Chamonix - was added in 2014.

La Petite Trotte à Léon is a non-competitive team event started in 2011.  Each team is made of two or three members for safety.  The route and direction of the course change every year. In 2015, it was run counterclockwise.

Today, the races consist of the following;
 UTMB: Ultra-Trail du Mont-Blanc (171 km +10,040 m)
 CCC: Courmayeur - Champex - Chamonix (101 km +6,100 m)
 TDS: Sur les Traces des Ducs de Savoie (145 km +9,100 m)
 OCC: Orsières - Champex - Chamonix (56 km +3,460 m)
 PTL: La Petite Trotte à Léon (approx. 300 km +30,000 m)
 MCC: De Martigny-Combe à Chamonix (40 km +2,300 m)
 YCC: Youth Chamonix Courmayeur (15 km +1,100 m)

Route 

The route follows the Tour du Mont Blanc hiking path that is usually completed in 7 to 9 days by hikers. This is a loop around Mont Blanc.

It starts from Chamonix (1,035 m) and goes up to the Col de Voza (1,653 m) to reach Les Contamines (1,150 m), which is the first life base. It then climbs to the Croix du Bonhomme (2,479 m) before going back down to Les Chapieux (1,549 m). The path then runs up to the Col de la Seigne (2,516 m) to enter Italy, and follows the ridge of the Mont-Favre (2,435 m) before going down to Courmayeur (1,190 m), the second life base. It climbs again to the Refuge Bertone (1,989 m) and Arnuva (1,769 m) before reaching its highest point, the Grand Col Ferret (2,537 m), which also marks the border with Switzerland. The path goes down again to Praz de Fort (1,151 m) via La Fouly (1,593 m) before reaching the third life base, Champex d'en Bas (1,391 m). The last part includes two rather low cols: Bovine (1,987 m) and Les Tseppes (1,932 m), separated by Trient (1,300 m). On the descent to Vallorcine (1,260 m), the path re-enters France and crosses Argentière (1,260 m) before finishing at Chamonix, its starting point.

The route varies slightly every year, sometimes for safety reasons. In 2010, the route was 166 km long with a total elevation gain of 9500m.

A more detailed profile can be found on the official website: UTMB profile.

Participation and results 

The race's popularity and its entry rate grew significantly since it was first held. The number of entrants doubled from 700 in 2003 to 1,400 in 2004. In 2005, the limit of 5,000 runners was reached 7 months after registration opened.
In 2006, the organisers decided to create the CCC to allow more runners to take part. The registrations were sold out in only 2 weeks.
In 2007, it was decided that runners must qualify, by running qualifying races beforehand and gaining points. That year the limit of 5,000 runners was reached less than 24 hours after registration opened.
For the 2008 event, 6,000 runners registered in only 8 minutes, 5 months before the race.
For the 2009 event, the qualifying criteria were tightened to limit the number of qualifying runners, and a draw was introduced to make entry fairer, giving an equal chance to all qualifiers, and making registration more orderly. Despite the stricter criteria, 10% of qualifying entrants were still denied a place, so the organisers raised entry standards still further for the 2010 event so that selection would be based more on capability and experience than luck of the draw.

The 2020 edition of the race was cancelled due to the coronavirus pandemic, with all registrants automatically receiving a 55% refund and given the option of reserving a spot for 2021, 2022, or 2023.

UTMB World Series and UTMB World Series Final

Overview 
On May 6, 2021, UTMB Group made a strategic alliance with famous Triathlon race operator IRONMAN Group, and launched a brand new series of Trail Running races: UTMB World Series, with Ultra-Trail du Mont-Blanc to be renamed as UTMB World Series Finals. The annual final competition of this series replaced the Ultra Trail World Tour (UTWT).

As of 2022, the UTMB World Series will integrate four levels of events:

 UTMB World Series Finals (Final race held in Chamonix, France, held in last week of each August)
 UTMB World Series Majors (One major race from UTMB World Series Events for each continent, with double the number of Running Stones for finishers)
 UTMB World Series Events (The only way for obtaining Running Stones for UTMB World Series Finals ballot)
 UTMB World Series Qualifiers (Runners can obtain UTMB Index but not Running Stones)

From the Year 2023, access for qualification of UTMB World Series Finals will have substantial changes, with obtaining Running Stones as the sole way of lottery entry, replacing ITRA Points. To enter the lottery, they need to:
 Have at least one Running Stone acquired in the previous two years
 Have a valid UTMB Index in the category corresponding to the Final. 

A Running Stone provides one entry in the lottery to participate in the UTMB World Series Finals. Running Stones can be collected by finishing a 20K, 50K, 100K or 100M race of the UTMB World Series circuit. Running Stones are recorded on the runner’s account and each Running Stone improves the odds in the lottery. A valid UTMB Index is achieved by completing at least one UTMB World Series Major, Event, or Qualifier race in the relevant category within the previous 24 months.

List of events 
Below is a list of 2022 and 2023 UTMB World Series events.

Ultra-Trail du Tour du Mont-Blanc

Ultra-Trail Courmayeur-Champex-Chamonix

Ultra-Trail Sur les Traces des Ducs de Savoie

Orsières-Champex-Chamonix

Results by nation

UTMB

CCC

TDS

Logistics 

 15000 volunteers were involved in 2015.
 North Face Ltd was the main sponsor from 2006 to 2014.  Columbia was the main sponsor from 2015 to 2021. HOKA is the current main sponsor of both the UTMB and the UTMB World Series.
 Kuala4k is the secondary environmental sponsor since 2014
 Runners must carry a minimum of equipment for safety reasons. This includes a waterproof jacket, warm clothing, food and water, whistle, mobile telephone, survival blanket and two head lamps.
 There are food and drink points along the route, every 10 to 15 km. In addition, four big "life bases" provide hot meals, beds and massages: Chamonix (France), Les Chapieux (France), Courmayeur (Italy) and Champex (Switzerland).
 At Courmayeur for UTMB and at Cormet de Roselend for TDS, runners can collect a drop bag they previously left at Chamonix or at Courmayeur.
 Runners' race numbers contain a magnetic badge that is read at approximately 50 check points. Timings and rankings are available online and by text message in real-time.
 It is conducted under the regulations of the International Trail Running Association (ITRA), the governing body for trail races in the Mont Blanc and Alpine region.
 PTL is a mostly self-supported run without course markings or aid stations.  Runners rely on a limited number of support points, mountain huts, local stores and restaurants for food and sleep. The course should be followed by GPS, maps, and the road book.  It goes as high as 3300 meters (11,000 feet) and must be completed in about 6 days.  Each team of two or three people carries a satellite beacon for safety. The course is modified every year and there are no official winners.

References

External links 
 Official web site - (main language: French, but also English, Spanish, Italian and German)
 Press kit on the official web site (PDF)
 UFO Les fous de l'UltraFOnd (French ultra runner web site)

Ultra-Trail World Tour
Ultramarathons in France
Athletics competitions in Switzerland
Athletics competitions in Italy
Athletics competitions in France
Trail running competitions
2003 establishments in Europe
Recurring sporting events established in 2003